Züünbayan-Ulaan (East rich red) is a sum (district) of Övörkhangai Province in southern Mongolia. In 2008, its population was 4,436.

References 

Districts of Övörkhangai Province